Dave Audé is an American DJ, producer and remixer. He operates his own label Audacious Records, and is known for having more number ones than any other producer on the Billboard Dance Club Songs chart. He has done production for artists such as U2, will.i.am, t.A.T.u., Katy Perry, Lady Gaga, Barenaked Ladies, Faith No More, Rihanna, Yoko Ono, Alexis Jordan, Madonna, CeCe Peniston, Jennifer Lopez, Celine Dion, LeAnn Rimes, Selena Gomez, Olivia Holt, Laura Pausini and Beyoncé. As an artist, Audé has scored 14 hit singles so far on the Billboard charts, and an unprecedented 132 No. 1 remixes on the Billboard Dance Club Songs chart. In 2016, Audé won a Grammy Award in the Best Remixed Recording, Non-Classical category for his remix of "Uptown Funk" by Mark Ronson and Bruno Mars. Audé's songs are represented by Downtown Music Publishing. He is managed by songwriter and producer Darrell Brown.

Biography
Audé is the older brother of former Major League Baseball player Rich Audé. Audé began his career teaching at the Los Angeles Recording Workshop as a MIDI instructor at the age of 22. In the 1990s, he began making house music at Truth, a Los Angeles dance club, and formed Lunatic Fringe with the club's owner, Steve Levy. They founded Moonshine Music, a record label, together, and built a studio in West Hollywood.
Audé began making compilation and remix albums, and as an artist has scored 14 hit singles: 1999's "Floor Filler Tune" (US Dance #20), 2006's "Common Ground" (US Dance #4), 2007's "Make It Last" (with Jessica Sutta) (US Dance #1), 2009's "Grass Is Greener" (with Sisely Treasure) (US Dance #1), 2010's "Figure It Out" (US Dance #1) with Isha Coco, a.k.a. Luciana, 2011's "I'm Still Hot" with Luciana (US Dance #1), 2012's "Never Forget" featuring Lena Katina (US Dance #1), 2012's "Something for the Weekend" with Luciana (US Dance #1), "Hold Me" with Yoko Ono (US Dance #1), 2013's "Electricity & Drums (Bad Boy)" with Akon & Luciana (US Dance #1), 2014's "Take Me Away" with Rokelle (US Dance #1), "Aftermath (Here We Go)" with Andy Bell (US Dance #1), "Hustlin'" with Vassy, Crazibiza (US Dance #1) and "True Original" again with Andy Bell (US Dance #1). Additionally, he has produced 133 #1 US Dance tracks to date, more than any other producer.

In 2006, Audé founded his own label, Audacious Records in order to release his own tracks.

In 2008, he appeared on the TV show Pussycat Dolls Present: Girlicious as part of Robin Antin's expert team to help the girls with vocal rehearsals. Audé was also Music Director for The Pussycat Dolls' Doll Domination Tour.

In 2010, Audé was nominated for a Grammy for his remix of Dean Coleman's "I Want You". As of 2015, he has produced for artists such as U2, KoЯn, Coldplay, Chris Brown, will.i.am, One Direction, t.A.T.u., Katy Perry, Barenaked Ladies, Faith No More, Sting, Juanes, Rihanna, Yoko Ono, Amy Grant, The Pussycat Dolls, Lady Gaga, Lunascape, Madonna, Wanessa, Britney Spears, CeCe Peniston, Selena Gomez & the Scene, LeAnn Rimes, Barbara Mandrell, Jennifer Lopez, Celine Dion, Ivy Levan, and Beyoncé.

In 2016 during the 58th Annual Grammy Awards, Audé received a Grammy for his remix of Mark Ronson and Bruno Mars' hit single "Uptown Funk". 

In 2022, Audé's remix of Demi Lovato and Ariana Grande's duet "Met Him Last Night" was nominated for Best Remixed Recording at the 64th Annual Grammy Awards.

On NYE 2023, Dave played live on 14 West Coast TV stations  to +70 Million Households and included music from his Full Length LP "Motions".

Discography 

 Audacious Summer Vol. 1 (2014)
 Audacious 4 (2013)
 Audacious Summer 2011 Sampler (2011)
 Audacious 3 (2011)
 2 Audacious (2009)
 Audacious (2006)

References

External links 
 

1969 births
Living people
American electronic dance music musicians
American house musicians
American DJs
Record producers from California
Remixers
Club DJs
Electronic dance music DJs
Ultra Records artists